Zhang Ye may refer to:

Zhang Ye (Later Shu) (died 948), Later Shu official and general
Zhang Ye (singer) (born 1968), Chinese singer
Zhang Ye (footballer, born 1987), Chinese football midfielder
Zhang Ye (footballer, born 1989), Chinese football forward

See also
Zhangye, a prefecture-level city in Gansu, China